Ricardo Daniel Altamirano  (born 12 December 1965) is a former Argentina international footballer who played as a defender.

Altamirano signed as a youth player in 1982 at Unión de Santa Fe, he made his breakthrough into the first team in 1986, but left the club shortly after their relegation from the Argentine Primera in 1988.

Altamirano joined Club Atlético Independiente in 1988, he was part of the squad that won the 1988–89 championship.

Altamirano received his first call-up to the Argentina national team in 1991. He played in three Copa Américas, he was part of the winning squad in 1991 and 1993 and part of the team that were eliminated in the Quarter finals by Brazil in 1995. Altamirano also represented Argentina in the FIFA Confederations Cup in 1992 won by Argentina.

In 1992 Altamirano joined River Plate where he went on to another six major titles, 4 league titles, the Copa Libertadores 1996 and the Supercopa Sudamericana 1997.

Honours

Club
 Independiente
Primera División Argentina: 1988–89

 River Plate
Primera División Argentina: Apertura 1993, Apertura 1994, Clausura 1997
Copa Libertadores: 1996
Primera División Argentina: Apertura 1996
Supercopa Sudamericana: 1997

International
 Argentina
Copa América: 1991, 1993
FIFA Confederations Cup: 1992
Artemio Franchi Trophy: 1993

External links
 Interview with El Litoral

1965 births
Living people
People from La Capital Department, Santa Fe
Argentine footballers
Association football defenders
Unión de Santa Fe footballers
Club Atlético Independiente footballers
Club Atlético River Plate footballers
Argentina international footballers
1991 Copa América players
1992 King Fahd Cup players
1993 Copa América players
1995 Copa América players
Copa América-winning players
Copa Libertadores-winning players
FIFA Confederations Cup-winning players
Argentine Primera División players
Sportspeople from Santa Fe Province